The Winding Way is the forthcoming third studio album by Australian indie blues rock band, The Teskey Brothers. The album was announced on 14 February 2023 and is scheduled for release on 16 June 2023.

The album was recorded in Sydney with producer Eric J Dubowsky. About the collaboration, Sam Teskey said, "We didn't want to go for a producer that was too close to our genre, we just wanted to branch out a bit and try to explore someone who was a bit down a different avenue."

Track listing

Release history

References

2023 albums
Upcoming albums
The Teskey Brothers albums